Bishop Castle is an "elaborate and intricate" "one-man project" named after its constructor, Jim Bishop, that has become a roadside attraction in central Colorado.

The "castle" is located in south central Colorado on State Highway 165 in the Wet Mountains of Southern Colorado in the San Isabel National Forest, southwest of Pueblo, Colorado.

Overview 
Bishop bought the land for the site for $450 when he was 15, and construction on what was originally intended to be a family project to build a cottage started in 1969. After Bishop surrounded the cottage with rocks, several neighbors noted that the structure looked something like a castle. Bishop took this into consideration and soon began building his castle.

According to Roadsideamerica, "for most" of the 40 years he has worked on the castle "Bishop was engaged in a running battle with Washington bureaucrats over the rocks that he used," which came from the National Forest surrounding his property. "Bishop felt that they were his for the taking, the government wanted to charge him per truckload." That dispute has been settled. In 1996, he was challenged by the local and state government over unsanctioned road signs that pointed to the site. They settled the dispute by issuing official road signs.

The site has become a tourist attraction, and RoadsideAmerica.com devoted a chapter to the castle and rated it "major fun" and describing it as, "one man's massive-obsessive labor of medieval fantasy construction". But it also issued a "parent's alert," warning potential visitors that Jim Bishop is "a tough-talking man with strong, extreme beliefs, and sometimes he expresses them bluntly and loudly. If you and your children want to avoid potentially offensive rants (involving politics), you may want to steer clear."

In the winter of 2014–15 a dispute developed over control of the castle after Jim Bishop and his wife Phoebe were both diagnosed with cancer, and David Merrill, who Jim "considered a friend," was made a trustee of Bishop Castle. According to Westword.com website, Merrill turned the site "into Castle Church—for the Redemption, according to the Custer County Clerk and Recorder's Office". Since then, the Bishops have "spent $20,000 trying to get a clear title to Bishop Castle, and to get Merrill's name off all paperwork."

A song about the castle, called "Fire Breathing Dragon," is featured on the 2017 album, The Castle Builder, by English musician Kid Carpet.

On March 28, 2018, a fire ignited on the Bishop Castle property, disintegrating the gift shop and a guest house. The fire is speculated to be electrical, and did not damage the castle itself (which is mostly made of stone). Despite the fire, the attraction re-opened to the public later that week, while being supported with donations and volunteer labor.

Gallery

References

External links 

 
 History, photos and status as of June 2007
 Entry at the Center for Land Use Interpretation
 Entry for Bishop Castle at the National Scenic Byways website

Visionary environments
Castles in the United States
Unfinished castles
Landmarks in Colorado
Folly buildings in the United States
Tourist attractions in Custer County, Colorado
Roadside attractions in Colorado
Houses in Custer County, Colorado
San Isabel National Forest